Derek (William) Lambert (10 October 1929 – 10 April 2001) was educated at Epsom College and was both an author of thrillers in his own name, writing also as Richard Falkirk, and a journalist.

As a foreign correspondent for the Daily Express, he spent time in many exotic locales that he later used as settings in his novels, the first of which, Angels in the Snow, was published in 1969. Between 1972 and 1977 he wrote a series of six novels beginning with Blackstone about a member of the Bow Street Runners in the 1820s.

His 1975 novel Touch the Lion's Paw was adapted to film as Rough Cut.

Bibliography

Novels (as Derek Lambert)
Desde la muerte (1981)
Angels in the Snow (1969)
The Kites of War (1969)
For Infamous Conduct (1970)
Grand Slam (1971)
The Red House (1972)
The Yermakov Transfer (1974)
Touch the Lion's Paw (1975)
The Great Land (1978)
The Saint Peter's Plot (1978)
The Memory Man (1979)
I, Said the Spy (1980)
Trance (1981)
The Red Dove (1982)
The Judas Code (1983)
The Golden Express (1984)
The Man Who Was Saturday (1985)
Vendetta (1986)
Chase (1987)
Triad (1987)
The Night and the City (1990)
The Gate of the Sun (1990)
The Banya (1991)
Horrorscope (1993)
Diamond Express (1994)
The Killing House (1997)

Novels (as Richard Falkirk)
The Chill Factor (1971)
The Twisted Wire (1972)

Blackstone novels (as Richard Falkirk)
A "Historical whodunnit" series, focusing on a Bow Street Runner Edmund Blackstone in 1820s London.

Blackstone (1972)
Blackstone's Fancy (1973)
Beau Blackstone (1973)
Blackstone and the Scourge of Europe (1974)
Blackstone Underground (1976)
Blackstone on Broadway (1977)

Non-fiction (as Derek Lambert)
The Sheltered Days [1965]
Don't Quote Me But [1979]
And I Quote [1980]
Unquote [1981]
Just Like the Blitz [1987]
Spanish Lessons [2000]

References

External links

2001 deaths
1929 births
British male journalists
People educated at Epsom College
British people of the Cyprus Emergency
Writers of historical mysteries
British male novelists
20th-century British novelists
20th-century English male writers